Three ships of the Hellenic Navy have borne the name Papanikolis (Παπανικολής), after the naval hero of the Greek War of Independence, Dimitrios Papanikolis:

 , a French-built boat, in service 1927–1945
 , an ex-US GUPPY-IIA boat, in service 1972–1993
 , the first boat of the Type 214 submarine class, in service since 2010

Hellenic Navy ship names
Set index articles on ships